Takesaki (written: 竹崎) is a Japanese surname. Notable people with the surname include:

, Japanese lawyer
, Japanese mathematician

See also
Takasaki (surname)

Japanese-language surnames